El Rancho may refer to:

El Rancho Charter School, a public charter school located in Anaheim, California
El Rancho High School, a public school in Pico Rivera, California
El Rancho Hotel & Motel, a Gallup, New Mexico Hotel listed as a National Historic Site
 El Rancho Hotel (Las Vegas), a Las Vegas hotel previously known as the Thunderbird (resort)
El Rancho Unified School District, the school system in Pico Rivera, California
El Rancho Vegas, the name of the first hotel on the Las Vegas Strip

Places named El Rancho:

El Rancho, California
El Rancho, New Mexico
El Rancho, Wyoming

See also
Rancho (disambiguation)